The Game is the debut (and only) album  by Danish dance-pop group Crispy, released mainly in mid-1998 throughout Scandinavia. Five single were released from the album: "Kiss Me Red", "Licky Licky", "Love Is Waiting" and "Calendar Girl" in 1998, and "Mr. Dinosaur" in 1999.

The Game was recorded and mixed in Denmark, Sweden and Germany. Several versions of the album were released, the most common being the release of 12 tracks. The album also featured a Japanese version that contained four unreleased tracks, including "Bad Girls" and "Happy King".

Track listing

References

1998 debut albums